Spirama biformis is a species of moth of the family Erebidae. It is found in Indonesia (Moluccas).

References

Moths described in 1924
Spirama